Wei Guoqing (Zhuang: Veiz Gozcing; 2 September 1913 – 14 June 1989) was a Chinese government official, military officer and political commissar of Zhuang ethnicity. He served as the Chairman of Guangxi from 1958 to 1975 and on the Chinese Communist Party's Politburo (1973–1982) and as Director of the People's Liberation Army's General Political Department (1977–1982). Wei was one of the few members of the 9th, 10th, 11th and 12th Central Committees (1969–1987) and the 10th through 12th politburos not purged during the Great Proletarian Cultural Revolution (GPCR) or Deng Xiaoping's backlash. He was also a Vice Chair of the National People's Congress Standing Committee (1975–1989) and of the Chinese People's Political Consultative Conference (1964–1983).

Biography 

Wei was born in Donglan, Guangxi, to a poor Zhuang minority family. He joined the Chinese Red Army at the age of 16 (1929) and the CPC in 1931. He rose to the rank of battalion commander in the Seventh Army under Deng Xiaoping and was a regimental commander on the Long March. After the Long March he served in the 344th Brigade, and then marched south under Huang Kecheng's 5th Column in January 1940. By 1944, he commanded the 4th Division of the New Fourth Army, and later three columns (the 2nd, 10th and 12th) of the North Jiangsu Army in the Huai-Hai Campaign. In 1948, Wei held off the Nationalist 2nd Army Corps of Qiu Qingquan and  100 tanks of the 5th Corps under the command of Jiang Weiguo (Chiang Wei-kuo, Chiang Kai-shek's son) in a decisive delaying action in the Huai-Hai Campaign. In 1949, Wei was deputy political commissar of General Ye Fei's Tenth Army Group of the Third Field Army.

Vietnam
Wei was deeply involved in China's relations with North Vietnam from 1950. In April of that year, Liu Shaoqi sent him to Vietnam as head of the Chinese Military Advisory Group, to advise  Ho Chi Minh on fighting the French;

In October 1953, Wei reportedly personally gave Ho Chi Minh a copy of the French Navarre plan.

In June 1954, Wei attended the 1954 Geneva Conference on Indochina  with Premier Zhou Enlai, USSR Foreign Minister Vyacheslav Molotov, Vietnamese representative Phạm Văn Đồng, US State Department official Bedell Smith and UK Deputy Under Secretary for Foreign Affairs for Administration Anthony Eden. Wei was specifically instructed to discuss military matters with the Vietnamese delegation when Molotov, Smith and Eden were not present.

When formal military ranks were introduced in 1955, Wei Guoqing was made a general, and in 1956 became an Alternate Member of the Central Committee at the Eighth National Party Congress.

Guangxi and Guangdong
After returning to China, Wei moved to Nanning, Guangxi, where he was the senior party (1961-GPCR) and government (1955-GPCR) official in Guangxi Autonomous Region for an unusually long period. It was from Guangxi and Yunnan that Chinese troops entered Vietnam in 1965–70.

In his role as the senior-most official in Guangxi, Wei hosted the January 1958 Nanning Conference, attended by Chairman Mao Zedong and most of the very top leadership. While Wei was a junior among the heavyweights, he was present at one of the decisive Great Leap Forward discussions where outrageous targets were approved.

General Wei was named 1st Political Commissar of the Guangxi Military District (MD) in January 1964, a post he held until October 1975. He added the leadership of the CPC committee in February 1971.

During the Cultural Revolution, Wei managed to keep control of Guangxi. In March 1967, Zhou Enlai ordered the establishment of the "Guangxi Revolutionary Preparatory Group", headed by incumbent CPC 1st Party Secretary Wei. However, Wei was beaten by a Guangxi-origin mob in August while visiting Beijing. In 1968, the "Guangxi April 22 Revolutionary Action Command" opposed  Wei Guoqing's leadership while the "Guangxi United Command of Proletarian Revolutionaries" supported him.

Central Leadership
In August 1982, Liberation Army Daily, the newspaper directly under General Political Department Director Wei's authority, published a broadside against "bourgeois liberalization" that was seen as an attack on Deng Xiaoping's policies just prior to the 12th Party Congress. As a result, Wei was dismissed, and replaced by General Yu Qiuli. He resigned from his posts in 1985 and died in Beijing in June 1989.

See also
 Guangxi Massacre

References

1913 births
1989 deaths
People from Hechi
Zhuang people
Counter-Japanese Military and Political University alumni
Chinese Communist Party politicians from Guangxi
People's Republic of China politicians from Guangxi
Chinese people of World War II
People of the Cultural Revolution
Delegates to the 1st National People's Congress
People of the Chinese Civil War
People's Liberation Army generals from Guangxi
Governors of Guangdong
Political office-holders in Guangxi
Presidents of Guangxi University
Members of the 12th Politburo of the Chinese Communist Party
Members of the 11th Politburo of the Chinese Communist Party
Members of the 10th Politburo of the Chinese Communist Party
Members of the 9th Central Committee of the Chinese Communist Party
Members of the 8th Central Committee of the Chinese Communist Party
Alternate members of the 8th Central Committee of the Chinese Communist Party
Vice Chairpersons of the National People's Congress
Vice Chairpersons of the National Committee of the Chinese People's Political Consultative Conference